Taghmaconnell or Taughmaconnell is a small village in County Roscommon, Ireland. It lies between Athlone and Ballinasloe. It is also the name of the parish in which the village lies.

The majority of people are farmers or work in the large factories and government offices in nearby towns. Ballinasloe is about 5.3 miles away and Athlone is about 6.8 miles away. There are castle ruins to be seen in Castlesampson, Clonbigney and Dundonnell. The village has one of the lowest crime rates in the country.

Religion 
The local church is dedicated to the memory of Saint Ronan who also had connections with the Aran Islands and Clonmacnoise. The important focal points within the parish – all depicted on the parish banner – are Saint Ronan’s Well, the National School and the Church. The  Parish Priest is  Fr. Sean Neylon. The present church dates back to 1805, before this the church was built it seems that mass was celebrated in a big barn across the road in what used to be Costello's shop. The first building on the present site was erected in 1805 on land donated by Brabazon Newcomen.

In 1860 a new church was built out of the foundations of the 1805 one. In 1961 major work was done on the church. The mortuary was built and the front door was set in. Wooden statues that were found under the altar during this renovation certainly came from Clontuskert Priory. They are now in the Diocesan Museum beside the Cathedral in Loughrea. All date back to 1200 to 1300 AD.

St Ronan’s well is situated in the town land of Shraduff in Taughmaconnell. Mass is celebrated there every year on 21 June (summer solstice). The tradition about this well is that Ronan was on his way from Aran to Clonmacnoise and stopped at a spring well to get a drink. There was a woman with a blind child at the well. Ronan blessed the well and anointed the child’s eye with the water. The child immediately had its sight restored.

Education 
Taughmaconnell currently has two primary schools, one in Taughmaconnell and one in Castlesampson. At present there are four teachers in Taughmaconnell and two teachers in Castlesampson.

Tríona Mc Loughlin is the current principal of Taughmaconnell NS and the school currently has 100 students, it is a Catholic school. Reports show the first school in  Taughmaconnell was built in 1852 and the old school is dated 1901.

Mary Naughton is the current principal of Castlesampson NS and the school currently has 40 students, it is a Catholic school. Reports show the first school in Castlesampson was built in 1853 while the second came in 1881.

Sport 
 Soccer – The local soccer team is Skyvalley Rovers which plays in the Roscommon and District League. The club was founded in 1971 and plays at Onagh Park close to Chapel Street the natural parish centre. The team has won 8 league titles, 7 Roscommon Cups and 10 league cups/division cups. The grounds have two full sized pitches. The pitch is also used by St Ronan’s Athletic Club and the Taughmaconnell Community Games are held there every year.
 Gaelic Games – The local GAA team is Padraig Pearses GAA Roscommon which is located outside the parish at Woodmount, just off the main Athlone-Ballinasloe N6 road.
 Tug of War – The local Tug of War club was established in 2009 and is affiliated to the Irish Tug of War Association. The team trains at Cloonkeen. The team were runners up in the All-Ireland in 2012.

Community Council 
The Taughmaconnell Community Council is a local council that helps assist residents of the village. It is made up of 21 representatives from every part of the village.

Notable residents 
 John G. Downey – the seventh Governor of California from 1860 to 1862 and namesake of Downey, California – was born in Castlesampson, Taughmaconnell in 1827.
 Brendan Shine, folk and country singer

See also 
 List of towns and villages in Ireland

References

Towns and villages in County Roscommon